The Golden Spike is the debut album by English band Sky Larkin, released on 2 February 2009.

Track listing

References

2009 debut albums
Wichita Recordings albums
Albums produced by John Goodmanson